Typotheria is a suborder of the extinct mammalian order Notoungulata and includes five families: Archaeopithecidae, Campanorcidae, Interatheriidae, Mesotheriidae, and Oldfieldthomasiidae. Cifelli indicated that Typotheria would be paraphyletic if it excluded members of the suborder Hegetotheria and he advocated inclusion of the hegetothere families Archaeohyracidae and Hegetotheriidae in Typotheria.

References 

Prehistoric animal suborders
Mammal suborders